The 1984 Tolly Cobbold Classic was the sixth and final edition of the professional invitational snooker tournament, which took place in February 1984 at the Corn Exchange in Ipswich, England.

Steve Davis won the tournament beating Tony Knowles 8–2 in the final.

Main draw

References

Tolly Cobbold Classic
Tolly Cobbold Classic
Tolly Cobbold Classic
Tolly Cobbold Classic